The 2008–09 Serbian League East season was the sixth season of the league under its current title. It began on 16 August 2008 and ended on 31 May 2009.

League table

External links
 Football Association of Serbia
 Football Association of East Serbia

Serbian League East seasons
3
Serbia